The UNEV pipeline is an  long pipeline from Woods Cross, Utah, USA, to the Las Vegas Valley at the Apex Industrial Park. This  facility has the capacity to store  of product. Expansion of the North Las Vegas Terminal was completed in 2014. An additional terminal facility, the  Cedar City Terminal, is located in Cedar City, Utah, with the capacity to store  of product.

This line is the second oil pipeline for Las Vegas, adding capacity and a second source to the Calnev Pipeline.  Completion was planned for operation in the spring of 2011. Commencement of operations was delayed to 2012 and is now operational.

History 

UNEV Pipeline, LLC. 
The pipe is owned and operated by UNEV Pipeline, LLC. which is a partnership between Holly Corporation (75%) and Sinclair Oil (25%).

Notes

External links 
http://www.hollyenergy.com/operations_UNEV.cfm

Energy infrastructure completed in 2012
Refined oil product pipelines in the United States
Transportation in the Las Vegas Valley
Energy infrastructure in Nevada
Buildings and structures in Clark County, Nevada
Energy infrastructure in Utah
Buildings and structures in Davis County, Utah
Oil pipeline companies
Pipelines in Utah
Pipelines in Nevada